The Baltimore Rock Opera Society (BROS) is an official 501c3 non-profit organization founded in 2007 by Aran Keating, John DeCampos, Dylan Koehler, Eli Breitburg-Smith and Jared Margulies with the mission of producing original, live rock operas.

BROS opened their first performance, Gründlehämmer, at 2640 Space located in Baltimore in 2009.  They hold open auditions for all their mainstage shows, including band auditions. Starting in 2011, BROS launched pitch parties, in which they asked the Baltimore community for ideas and suggestions on future rock operas. BROS Headquarters (HQ), where they currently operate, is located on the first floor of the Bell Foundry, a multi-purpose, cooperatively-run performance and rehearsal space.  As of May 2018, the BROS has produced thirteen completely original stage productions and has staged many other events and performances. The company performs in various venues in Baltimore, Washington DC and Philadelphia.

Rock Operas and Events

Gründlehämmer (2009) 
The Baltimore Rock Opera Society debuted its first feature-length rock opera in October 2009. Featuring monsters, magic and fantastical adventure, Gründlehämmer introduced the world to the BROS's sense of the epic. The plot follows a farmer and citizen of the nation of Brotopia who wields his mighty command over the power of true rock to defeat the evil cave-dwelling Grundle and release Brotopia from the iron grip of the tyrannical Dark King Lothario.

The BROS Double Feature 
In June 2011, BROS debuted two new plays, Amphion, a love story set in a magical realist 6th c. BC Constantinople, and The Terrible Secret of Lunastus.

Both shows were eventually remounted as full feature-length productions, Amphion in 2016 and Lunastus in 2017.

Valhella: The Ragnarøkkoperetta 
In May 2012 at the Autograph Playhouse in Baltimore, MD, BROS debuted their fourth feature-length rock opera, Valhella, written by Jen Tydings and directed by Aran Keating.

Valhella was loosely adapted from Norse mythology and executed in pursuit of what composer Richard Wagner called Gesamtkunstwerk – “that mashup of spectacle, ritual, dance, music, theater and other artsy stuff that is opera at its most extreme.” The opera used large puppets, hand-drawn animation, intricate sets with a full-scale World tree and featured a soundtrack that ranged from traditional Norse folk music to power metal. Vahella was considered a monumental leap forward in the BROS’ production value. All eight shows sold out, which prompted the BROS to add a ninth encore presentation at midnight on 20 May 2012, which also sold out. The opera was well reviewed by the Washington Post.

Murdercastle 
In May 2013 at the Autograph Playhouse in Baltimore, MD, BROS debuted their fifth feature-length rock opera, Murdercastle, written by Jared Margulies and directed by Barbara Geary.  The play is about H. H. Holmes during the 1893 Chicago World's Fair.

Gründlehämmer (2014) 
From March to April 2014 at 2640 Space in Baltimore, MD, The Torpedo Factory Art Center in Alexandria, VA and The Ruba Club in Philadelphia, BROS re-imagined and transformed their original production, Gründlehämmer. This remount was again directed by Aran Keating.

Convergence Maximus 
In November 2014 at 2640 Space in Baltimore, BROS collaborated with the Concert Artists of Baltimore (CAB) on Convergence Maximus, to produce a mix of classical greats such as Tchaikovsky's Violin Concerto and select songs from past BROS shows such as Valhella. These were arranged to include CAB's professional orchestra and choir.

Rock Opera 6-Pack 
The Rock Opera 6-Pack debuted in May 2015 at the Creative Alliance in Baltimore. The 6-pack was a new format for the BROS: a collection of six one-act rock operas, 25 minutes each, split into two weekends. "A" Weekend featured Determination of Azimuth, Revival, and Sidelines. "B" Weekend featured Battle at Apple Crossing, Legend of Jessie Jean, and RATS!

At Artscape 2015, the 6-Pack was remounted in BROCEAN CITY located on Charles Street. BROCEAN CITY not only featured the five of the 6-pack, but included local bands, puppet shows, and air guitar battles atop the BRÖTHERSHIP, a converted 1988 Saab 900.

"A" Weekend 

Determination of Azimuth: was created by Eric Church and Heather Graham and directed by Lola Pierson. The show is the story of Katherine Johnson, who rose above barriers of race and gender and became a famous mathematician of the Apollo program.
 Revival was directed by Craig Coletta and composed by Samuel Burt. The opera features a faith healer at a tent revival who encounters a demon that has possessed a young child.
 Sidelines was written, directed and composed by Jack Sossman. The opera features many aspects of sports including “glorious victories, crushing defeats, last-minute-plays, training montages, and foot-stomping anthemic glam rock.”

"B" Weekend 

 The Battle of Blue Apple Crossing was created and composed by Nairobi Collins and directed by Sarah “Flash” Gorman. The opera is a retelling of the legend of Robert Johnson at the crossroads where a talented blues musician is the victim of a lynching and his soul becomes the subject of a battle of wits and strength between the Christian devil and the African trickster god Legba.
 The Legend of Jessie Jean was created and directed by Matt Casella. The opera is dark Western folk tale where outlaws swap campfire stories of a ruthless bounty hunter hell-bent on bringing criminals to justice featuring shadowplay.
 RATS! was created and co-composed by Naomi Davidoff, and Andres Lobo and directed by Amanda Rife. The opera was a punk/garage-rock parody of a popular Broadway show. RATS! told the story of a motley crew of hard-rocking rodents just trying to dance, party and fall in love – with a sinister exterminator on their tails.

Chronoshred: The Adventures of Stardust Lazerdong 
In January 2015, BROS premiered Chronoshred: The Adventures of Stardust Lazerdong, an action-packed sci-fi comedy telling the story of a time-traveling rock god and his band of colorful alien characters as they battle an evil mega-corporation and fulfill their destiny to throw the biggest concert of all time (literally).

Taking inspiration from 80s and 90s Saturday morning cartoons, Chronoshred featured madcap antics, colorful sets, costumes and props, and was told in an episodic format.

Amphion 
Debuting in June 2016, Amphion is the tragic love story of a supernatural songwriter in ancient Constantinople. The show was the first of the BROS's 2011 Double Feature to be remounted into a full-length feature production.

Brides of Tortuga 
Brides of Tortuga, BROS's eighth original rock opera, debuted in October, 2016 at the Chesapeake Bay Performing Arts Center. Tortuga is set in 1661 and follows a mutinous group of women who liberate a group of captured women in Calais, France, capture a French navy ship, and escape across the open Atlantic to free more women captured on the island of Tortuga. A work of historical fiction, Tortuga is loosely based on the history of the island of Tortuga and uses the fallout of the Fronde as its backdrop.

The Terrible Secret of Lunastus 
The Terrible Secret of Lunastus, which premiered in a remount of an earlier, shorter production part of the BROS's 2011 Double Feature, is a sci-fi comedic adventure. As the moon falls towards Earth, on the eve of our planet's destruction, four astronauts and their robot Android, travel to the mysterious world of Lunastus to determine its suitability as a new home planet. The creatures the crew meets change the course of their lives and the fate of the planet.

Constellations & Crossroads 
Run in February 2018, Constellations & Crossroads was a double-feature in collaboration with The Arena Players showcasing two 6-Pack short plays: Determination of Azimuth and The Battle of Blue Apple Crossing. The plays are centered on two important black figures in American history (Katherine Johnson in Azimuth and Robert Johnson in Battle) and featured a cast and crew from The Arena Players, Baltimore's oldest continuously-run African-American community theater company.

Incredibly Dead! 
Debuting in May 2018, Incredibly Dead! is the newest BROS production, created as a tribute to B-level horror films, such as From Beyond. Twenty years ago, General Maximilian Morder devised a plan to control the world with the aid of a necromantic goo. The elixir falls into the hands of Reggie and Silas Cryptz, two down-on-their-luck morticians desperate to turn their business around after drawing the ire of a family they've cheated in the past. Featuring gratuitous gore, slapstick humor, and original music inspired by classic science-fiction film soundtracks, Incredibly Dead! is getting positive reviews from the Baltimore theater community.

Reception 
As an all-volunteer company, BROS has attracted the support of the surrounding community. Those involved in the productions range from individuals with experience in the theater world to complete amateurs. In 2012 Baltimore City Paper named Baltimore Rock Opera Society “Best DIY Theater Company” in Baltimore.

Documentary 
There is currently a feature-length documentary film being produced about the BROS and the Murdercastle production. The film is being directed by Human Being Productions and being produced by the digital magazine What Weekly. It will feature original animation and interviews in addition to the footage of the production.

References

External links 
 BROS website
 BROS on Facebook
 BROS on Twitter

2007 establishments in Maryland
Charles Village, Baltimore
Culture of Baltimore